Kasatkino is a rural locality (a selo) and the administrative center of Kasatkinsky Selsoviet of Arkharinsky District, Amur Oblast, Russia. The population was 242 in 2018. There are 14 streets.

Geography 
Kasatkino is located on the left bank of the Amur River, 66 km south of Arkhara (the district's administrative centre) by road. Novopokrovka is the nearest rural locality.

References 

Rural localities in Arkharinsky District